Board of Admiralties (Admiralteystv-kollegiya) was a supreme body for the administration of the Imperial Russian Navy and admiralty shipyards in the Russian Empire, established by Peter the Great on December 12, 1718, and headquartered in the Admiralty building, Saint Petersburg. It included several other admiralties of the Imperial Russia among which is the Nikolaev Admiralty.

History
The responsibilities of the Admiralty Board had been changing throughout its history. It supervised the construction of military ships, ports, harbors, and canals and administered Admiralty Shipyard. The Admiralty Board was also in charge of naval armaments and equipment, preparation of naval officers etc. The first president of the Admiralty Board was Count Fyodor Apraksin. In 1720, the Admiralty Board published a collection of naval decrees called Книга - устав морской о всем, что касается доброму управлению в бытность флота в море (A Naval Charter On Everything That Has To Do With Good Management Of A Fleet At Sea), authored by Peter the Great himself among other people. In 1777 the Admiralty Board founded the Russian Hydrographic Service, implementing a plan that marked the beginning of systematic drawing of nautical charts.

In 1802, the Board of Admiralties became a part of the Ministry of the Navy. Along with the Admiralty Board, there was also the Admiralty Department in 1805–1827 with the responsibilities of the Chief Office of the Ministry. In 1827, the Admiralty Board was turned into the Admiralty Council (Адмиралтейств-совет), which would exist until the October Revolution of 1917.

In new Russia (Russian Federation) the historic Admiralty Board has been reborn as the Maritime Board (Morskaya Kollegiya) having broad functions to coordinate Russia's maritime future.

List of the Imperial Russian admiralties
 Main (Saint-Petersburg) Admiralty (1704–1908), turned to Admiralty Shipyards
 Okhta (Saint-Petersburg) Admiralty (1803–1896), turned to the Joint Stock Society B.Kreinton and Co., later Petrozavod
 Voronezh Admiralty (1696–1711)
Tavrov Admiralty (1705–1769)
Stupino Shipyard (1697–1700)
 Arkhangel Gorod Admiralty
 Astrakhan Admiralty (1722–1867), moved to Baku
 Irkutsk Admiralty (1803–1839)
 Kazan Admiralty (1718–1830)
 Nizhniy Novgorod Shipyard (1722–1830)
 Kronstadt Admiralty (planned transfer of the Main Admiralty to Kronstadt)
 Nikolaev Admiralty (1788–1911), turned to the Russian Shipbuilding Joint Stock Society, later Mykolayiv Shipyard
 Kherson Admiralty (1778–1829), merged to Nikolaev Admiralty

See also
 Admiralty building, Saint Petersburg
 Admiralty Shipyard
 List of Russian Admirals
 Peter von Sivers
 Russian Hydrographic Service

References

External links
English site on the Admiralty

Imperial Russian Navy
Culture in Saint Petersburg
1718 establishments in Russia
History of Saint Petersburg